Jorge Gustavo Armando Rodríguez-González (23 April 1889 – 1965) was a Cuban composer and musician. Rodriguez-Gonzalez played numerous musical instruments and played in various bands and orchestras during his long career.  He also composed many pieces of music, such as Aurora and Por Que Te Fuiste.

He was the son of Jose de Jesus Rodriguez-Ferrer and Maria Andrea Gonzalez-Ramos. His uncle, Antonio Rodriguez-Ferrer, was the composer of the musical introductory notes to the Cuban national anthem. On July 4, 1913, he married Isolina Caridad Fontanills-de Ugarte, one of the first women to have graduated from a Cuban school in nursing. They had two daughters, Maria del Carmen and Lucia Josefina Rodriguez-Fontanills, in additioned he raised his orphaned niece, Amelia Rogelia Penichet-Rodriguez. His grandson Clemente G. Gomez-Rodriguez is a writer and attorney.

His family at one point owed what is now known as Reparto de Miraflores Viejo (neighborhood of Old Miraflores) and he lived his entire life at Calle Primera #40, esquina J, in Miraflores (original house torn down in 1950s). He died of cancer in 1965.

References
 http://www.nacion.cult.cu/en/arf.htm 

1889 births
1965 deaths
Cuban composers
Male composers
People from Havana
Cuban male musicians